Kastrati is an Albanian surname. It is derived from the name of a tribe of the Malësi e Madhe area in Northern Albania. In 1403, certain Aleksa Kastrati, a lord of three villages, received a gift from the governor of Shkodër.

People called Kastrati include:

Arian Kastrati (born 2001), Kosovan footballer
Bekim Kastrati (born 1984), Albanian footballer
Flamur Kastrati (born 1991), Kosovan footballer
Lirim Kastrati (footballer, born January 1999), Kosovan footballer
Lirim Kastrati (footballer, born February 1999), Kosovan footballer

See also
 House of Kastrioti

References 

Edith Durham,  High Albania (London: Edward Arnold, 1909),   chapter 3

Albanian-language surnames
Toponymic surnames
Ethnonymic surnames